Michael Hyde is an American linguist, currently a University Distinguished Professor at Wake Forest University. He received a Distinguished Scholar Award in 2013 from the National Communication Association, and in 2019 he won the Association's Communication Ethics Top Book Award for his 2018 book The Interruption that We Are: The Health of the Lived Body, Narrative, and Public Moral Argument.

Books

As author
 Communication Philosophy and the Technological Age (University of Alabama Press, 1982). 
 The Life-Giving Gift of Acknowledgment: A Philosophical and Rhetorical Inquiry (Purdue University Press, 2005). 
 The Call of Conscience: Heidegger and Levinas, Rhetoric and the Euthanasia Debate (University of South Carolina Press, 2008). 
 Perfection: Coming to Terms with Being Human (Baylor University Press, 2010). 
 Openings: Acknowledging Essential Moments in Human Communication (Baylor University Press, 2012). 
 The Interruption That We Are: The Health of the Lived Body, Narrative, and Public Moral Argument (University of South Carolina Press, 2018).

As editor
 (with Walter Jost) Rhetoric and Hermeneutics in Our Time: A Reader (Yale University Press, 1997). 
 The Ethos of Rhetoric (University of South Carolina Press, 2004). 
 (with Nancy M. P. King) Bioethics, Public Moral Argument, and Social Responsibility (Routledge, 2012) 
 (with James A. Herrick) After the Genome: A Language for Our Biotechnological Future (Baylor University Press, 2013).

References

Year of birth missing (living people)
Living people
Wake Forest University faculty
Linguists from the United States